The 2020 Iowa Republican presidential caucuses took place on Monday, February 3, 2020, as the first caucus or primary in the Republican Party presidential primaries for the 2020 presidential election. The Iowa caucuses are a closed caucus, with Iowa awarding 40 pledged delegates to the Republican National Convention, allocated on the basis of the results of the caucuses. Incumbent president Donald Trump received about 97 percent of the vote to clinch 39 delegates, while Bill Weld received enough votes to clinch 1 delegate.

Procedure

Precinct caucuses were held on the evening of Monday, February 3, 2020, in order to directly allocate delegates to the Iowa Republican county conventions. Only registered Iowan Republicans were allowed to participate. These delegates were proportionally allocated to each candidate based on the statewide vote.

The county conventions were subsequently held on Saturday, March 14, 2020, to choose delegates for both the Republican Congressional District conventions and the Iowa Republican state convention. The congressional district conventions were then scheduled for Saturday, April 25, 2020, to elect Iowa's 12 district delegates to the Republican National Convention. The Iowa Republican state convention on Saturday, June 13, 2020, elected the rest of the state's delegates to the Republican National Convention.

Campaign
A number of Republican candidates had campaign events in the state during 2019 and January 2020, including Weld and Walsh attending Democratic forums. Trump's campaign was active as well, having several surrogates attend events culminating in a rally in Des Moines attended by the president himself, on January 30. Among the cities that Bill Weld campaigned in was Sioux City, where he presented himself as an alternative to Trump on a variety of issues, ranging from economic conservatism to climate change.

The Trump campaign used the caucus as a "scrimmage" in order to test out get out the vote techniques and other improved methods and political marketing.

Polling

Results

See also
 2020 Iowa Democratic presidential caucuses

References

Iowa Republican
Republican caucus
2020
Iowa Republican caucuses